Camille Van Hoorden (15 February 1879 – 31 July 1919) was a Belgian footballer and coach. He was part of the Belgian team (Université de Bruxelles), which won the bronze medal at the exhibition tournament at the Olympic Games in Paris in 1900, listed in the Official Report as C. Van Hoorden.

He won 24 caps for the Belgian team between 1904 and 1912. He was captain 11 times, and took part in the Belgium–France game of 1904, the first official game played by the two national teams.

At club level, he played for Sporting Club de Bruxelles and Union F.C. d'Ixelles in the 1895–96 season and for Racing Club de Bruxelles between 1896 and 1914. He scored 16 goals from 204 matches.

Honours

Club

Racing Club Bruxelles 

 Belgian First Division: 1907-08
 Belgian Cup: 1912

International

Belgium 

 Olympic Games: 1900 (bronze)

Individual 

 Former Belgium's Most Capped Player: 1912-1928 (24 caps)

References

External links
 

1879 births
1919 deaths
People from Watermael-Boitsfort
Belgian footballers
Footballers at the 1900 Summer Olympics
Association football midfielders
Belgium international footballers
K.F.C. Rhodienne-De Hoek players
Belgian football managers
Standard Liège managers
Footballers from Brussels